Mehkar is a tabletop tehsil and a municipal council situated in Buldhana district of the Indian state of Maharashtra. Located at the bank of Painganga River, Mehkar falls in the Vidarbha region of Maharashtra.

Demographics
 India census Mehkar had a population of 65,245 constitute 51.64% of the population and females 78.36%. Mehkar has an average literacy rate of 78%, higher than the national average of 62.5%: male literacy is 76%, and female literacy is 65%. In Mehkar, 18% of the population is under 6 years of age.

History 
The village of Sakharkherda is adjacent to the legendary and historically famous city of Mehkar. There was a battle between Nizam and Mubarak Khan. At that time the Baji Rao I had come. The Madhavrao I, who came to conclude a treaty with Januji Bhosale on March 22, 1769, lived with Mehkar for some time.Lord Chakradharaswamy of Mahanubhav sect had a long stay in Mehkar. He lived in Bhairav ​​and Baneshwar temples. 62, 63, 64 in Lilacharitra are in reference to Lila Mehkar. It is also believed that Mehekar was the abode of ascetics in Dandakaranya. In this taluka, there are 7 villages like Delap of Bagdalabhya sage, Vadali of Vasishtha, Gomeshwar of Gautam sage, Pathardi of Parashara, Drugbori of Durvasa and Vishvimitra's world.

Haran Tekdi
Haran Tekdi has an old temple. There is anecdotal saying about this place that 'Lord Rama' had stayed here during his 'vanwasa' , he once caught a deer- Haran in Marathi language, so the name 'Haran Tekdi'.

Shri Nrusiha Mandir
Prahlad Varad Shri Laxmi Nrusiha Mandir is the temple of God Nrusiha situated at the bank of Painganga. It is the oldest idol in the city belongs to the 4th century A.D. Pre Vakatak Period. This idol is founded by Shri Shyamraj Maharaj Pitale in 1479. According to the dream, he got it in the Malipeth area in the underground two rooms. Sant Shri Balabhau Maharaj Pitale was a saint, devotee of Narasimha. Now his disciple Ad. Rangnath Maharaj Pitale (Babasaheb) maintains all traditions of this Mandir.

Shwasanand Saraswati at Sant Shri Balabhau Maharaj Pitale
Om Brahmi Shwasanand Saraswati Urf Sant Shri Balabhau Maharaj Pitale is the first saint of Varkari Sampradaya in Vidarbha borne at Mehkar in 1888 A.D. He was Disciple of Aanandi Aatmanand Rangnath Maharaj, Navha (Di. Buldana). He formed Hans Sampradaya which is under the Varkari Cult. Many miracles happened in his biography. He started first Dindi for Pandharpur, Paithan, Mahur, Ghrushneshwar, Muktai Nagar from Mehkar. He worked for Jatibhed Nirmulan (demolishing of Caste system), equality, the spread of love in society and up-gradation of suppressed class like women and lower classes of society. In his life of 42 years, he obeyed all four Aashramas and in the last, he became Paramhans Parivrajkacharya 1008 Om Brahmee Shwasanand Saraswati. He took Sanjieevan Samadhee at Varanasi in 1930 A.D. At Mehkar he built Dnyanmandir as his Gurupeeth. Now Gurupeethdhish Ad. Rangnath Maharaj Pitale is keeping all Parampara.

Shree Sant Gajanan Maharaj and Senaji Maharaj Mandir (Nabhik)
It has a temple called "Shree Sant Gajanan Maharaj on Dongaon road and Senaji Maharaj" And "Vitthal Rukhmini" (Mola Road, Sena Nagar, Mehkar).
It also has in its surrounding i.e. 12  km to its north a Dargah of AULIYA BABA at the outskirts of an ancient village named MOLA and is revered by every community irrespective of religion, caste, creed living in and around Mehkar. A week long annual fair ("Jatra", in local language) is held nearby the Dargah.

Balaji Temple
An idol of Lord Balaji, along with copper scripture (Tamrapat) was found during digging in 1888 AD.
There is a temple of the Hindu God Balaji that is more than 120 years old. The documents written on copper found with Balaji's sculpture are now in the British Museum, England.
it is the largest sculpture of Lord Balaji in Asia.

This idol is made in a single black stone. There is a yearly celebration for Lord Balaji. Everyday visitors/tourists and the poor are provided with free food.

Kanchani mahal
In local folklore, the structure is connected with many tales and mysteries.

The structure and the bricks are of Mughal architectural pattern and was designed for camping of an army and housing a very high ranking army officer of those times.

The aforesaid monument is currently in ruins due to the lack of attention from the ASI. However, the story connected to Kanchani Mahal seems to be a myth. Looking at the ruins one could easily gauge that the bricks are of Mughalia shapes and the monument would have been constructed to house and camp a general (or Shahenshah) of Aurangazeb's stature during Great Chhatrapati Shivaji Maharaj's period in their campaign to crush the rising of the great Maratha warrior.

According to local people, Kanchani Mahal was a seven storeyed palace constructed by a king to his concubine (known as Kanchani in Hindi) to provide a safe place for her and to protect her from public humiliation. From the top of the seventh storey, she was able to see the temple and lighthouse in the village without needing to travel to the temple directly. She is said to have committed suicide from the seventh storey since she was often ridiculed by the public that her palace is on a higher level than the temple in the village. The building was constructed using a cementing material made of cowdung, which provided natural insulation from heat and cold. Today only two storeys remain and the rest of the building is deteriorated. The palace is estimated to be roughly 400 years old by the local people of Mehkar.

The ASI will be the right authority to ascertain the truth if they take an interest.

N G Deshpande, renowned poet of Maharashtra, composed extensively on Kanchan Mahal.

Kiran Shivhar Dongardive, another renowned poet from Mehkar has composed some poems on Kanchani Mahal. His poem is a work of fiction and cannot be construed as reality.
However, Kanchani in Marathi as well as in Hindi dialect literally means a Courtesan or a dancing girl meant to entertain clients of higher class.

Painganga River 
Mehkar is on the banks of the Painganga River, another name of Paingnga river is 'Pranhita', which provides multiple recreational activities. On the bank of this river there is Saoji Galli. In it, there is an old Vitthal mandir rather first Vitthal mandir in Mehkar, idol of this Vitthal, got in hands of Kimbahune Anster in Vari, to Ananta Shastri, it was a very religious place. A religious story is also attached to the Painganaga River that this river is formed by falling out of "Pranita Patram" from lord Vishanu's hand and has on location and story also mentioned in "Padma Puram". At the site of the Olandeshwar Tempel river Painganga changes its direction when the water level is low.

References

Cities and towns in Buldhana district